Veronica verna is a species of flowering plant belonging to the family Plantaginaceae.

Its native range is Morocco, Europe to Southwestern Siberia and Himalaya.

References

verna